Sophie Lee (born 7 August 1968) is an Australian film, stage and television actress and author.

Career
Lee worked as a model early in her career, both in Australia and Japan appearing in print and on TV. Her first feature film was Raw Silk in 1988.

She first rose to fame in 1990 for hosting The Bugs Bunny Show on Australian TV. The show provoked controversy through her wardrobe, which was publicised as "middle-aged men... rush home from work in time to watch Sophie throw to Bugs Bunny cartoons".  The Nine Network series, which had previously not been hosted, featured Bugs Bunny and other Warner Bros. Looney Tunes and Merrie Melodies cartoons, plus occasional other material, such as an interview between Sophie and Kylie Minogue.  She was cast by executive producer David Lyle out of 150 candidates. In 1991, Lee started playing the ongoing role of Penny Wellings in the drama series The Flying Doctors.

Also that year Lee, on saxophone and vocals, formed a pop group, Freaked Out Flower Children, with Gumpy Phillips on lead vocals and guitar (ex-Battle Happy); Tricky J as synthesiser programmer; Nicole Love on backing vocals; and Fiona Ruttelle on backing vocals. In December that year the group issued their sole album, Love In, which Australian musicologist, Ian McFarlane, found was "full of syncopated beats and breezy melodies wrapped around tunes". The group's debut single, "Spill the Wine", was a cover version of  Eric Burdon and War's 1970 hit. Freaked Out Flower Children's version reached No. 31 on the ARIA Singles Chart but by 1993 the group had disbanded "the concept had run its course ... [as the] retro-cabaret and day-glo focus of the ensemble ... did little to foster a sense of longevity".

In 1992, she also hosted the TV series Sex.  Lee built on this in the media, speaking out on feminism, sexism and the need for sex education in the AIDS era.

Lee has acted in a number of iconic films, including the Australian comedies Muriel's Wedding, Bootmen and The Castle as well as cult films such as He Died with a Felafel in His Hand and Titsiana Booberini.  She is a patron of "Big Screen" at the National Film and Sound Archive.

For her performance in the 1997 film The Castle, Lee was nominated for the Australian Film Institute Award for Best Supporting Actress.

Lee has appeared in a number of stage productions, including Mr Kolpert with the Sydney Theatre Company and the title role in "The Virgin Mim".

From 2008, she has hosted "Natgeo Presents with Sophie Lee" on the National Geographic channel. She is also a commentator on the series 20 to 1.

She has now branched into writing, releasing a book in 2007 titled "Alice in La La Land" through Random House publishing. The book is inspired by her time spent in Hollywood. Also in 2007, she became a columnist for "Sunday Magazine". In 2009 Sophie  released her first children's novel titled "Edie Amelia and the Monkey Shoe Mystery", a story for 7+ year-olds, published by Pan Macmillan.  The second title in the series is "Edie Amelia and The Runcible River Fever".

Personal life
Born in Newcastle, New South Wales, her family did not have a TV in the house as her father, a philosophy professor at the University of Newcastle, preferred more intellectual pursuits. She attended the local public school in Dudley, Newcastle, and St Mary's Convent school. She completed year 12 at St Francis Xavier College, Hamilton, in 1986, achieving academic excellence. She appeared in a school production of "Frankenstein", playing Baron Frankenstein. She moved to Sydney at age 18 for her career. When working at GTV-9 in the early 1990s, she lived in St Kilda, Victoria.

For six years up to early 2000, she was the partner of Melbourne comedian/writer/actor Mick Molloy, regularly appearing on his nationally syndicated radio show.

In 2002 she married Anthony Freedman and stated that she would be converting to Judaism. The couple have a daughter, Edie, and two sons, Tom and Jack.

In popular culture
 Australian band TISM's song "Get Thee to a Nunnery" was specifically about Sophie Lee, mentioning her by name.
 23 June 2009 Lee appeared on the Australian Television show Talkin' 'Bout Your Generation as a member of the 'Generation X' team.

Filmography

FILM

TELEVISION

References

External links
Sophie Lee article at the Museum of Broadcast Communications

Freaked Out Flower Children – Spill the Wine, YouTube
Pre-fame Portmans ad YouTube

1968 births
Living people
Australian film actresses
People from Newcastle, New South Wales
Australian television actresses
Australian stage actresses
Actresses from New South Wales